The Sudamericano Femenino or Copa América Femenina is a women's football tournament held in South America.

(Campeonato) Sudamericano Femenino may also refer to:
South American Under-20 Women's Football Championship
South American Under-17 Women's Football Championship
Copa América Femenina de Futsal
Women's South American Volleyball Championship
South American Basketball Championship for Women